PsyFive (Korean: 싸이파이브) is the fifth album by South Korean singer Psy. The album was released on October 20, 2010. The album contains 12 songs. The album was also released worldwide through iTunes. It is Psy's debut album for YG Entertainment.

Track listing

Charts
Album

Singles

Other charted songs

References

2010 albums
Korean-language albums
Psy albums
YG Entertainment albums
Stone Music Entertainment albums